Howittia is a genus of plant containing the single species, Howittia trilocularis, commonly known as blue howittia, and is endemic to Australia. It is a tall shrub found growing in shaded valleys and on rainforest edges, it has hairy leaves and single, purple flowers.

Description
The under surface pale, white, yellow or brownish, irregularly covered with rusty or whitish star-shaped hairs, upper surface dark green. The seed capsule is rounded or indented globular shaped,  in diameter and covered with soft, silky or star-shaped hairs. Flowering occurs from September to January.

Taxonomy
Howittia trilocularis was first formally described in 1855 by Ferdinand von Mueller and the description was published in Definitions of rare or hitherto undescribed Australian plants from the type specimen which was found growing on "bushy declivities around Lake King". The genus was named after Godfrey Howitt, a Melbourne physician, in recognition of his work as an amateur botanist. The specific epithet (trilocularis) means "having three locules.

Distribution
It is found growing in sheltered gullies, rainforest margins and eucalypt forests in New South Wales, Victoria and South Australia.

References

Malvoideae
Flora of New South Wales
Flora of South Australia
Flora of Victoria (Australia)
Malvaceae genera
Malvales of Australia
Monotypic Malvales genera
Taxa named by Ferdinand von Mueller